Medway Microlights is a British aircraft manufacturer, specializing in the manufacture of ultralight trikes and fixed wing microlight aircraft. The company is located in Rochester, Kent.

Medway Microlights is the oldest established approved microlight aircraft manufacturer in the UK.

The company is known for its Raven wing. Designed in the 1980s, it remains in production.

Aircraft

References

External links

Aircraft manufacturers of England
Ultralight trikes
Companies based in Kent